Laurence George Decore  (born Lavrentiy Dikur; June 28, 1940 – November 6, 1999) was Canadian lawyer and politician from Alberta. He was of Ukrainian descent. He was mayor of Edmonton, a member of the Legislative Assembly of Alberta, and leader of the Alberta Liberal Party.

Early life 
Decore was born Lavrentiy Dikur (Ukrainian: Лаврентій Дікур) in Vegreville, Alberta on June 28, 1940, the son of future Liberal Party of Canada MP and judge John Decore (Ivan Dikur). While he was a child, the family Anglicized its name to "Decore." He was educated in Vegreville, Ottawa, and after 1957, Edmonton, where he played curling and soccer.

Decore graduated from the University of Alberta in 1961 with B.A. in history and political economy, and in 1964 with an LL.B. He was called to the bar the year of his graduation, and eventually founded the firm Decore & Company. He married Anne Marie Fedoruk (who later became the University of Alberta's Associate Vice President Academic), with whom he had two children, Michael and Andrea.

Decore was involved in a number of business ventures that made him a millionaire. These included the Edmonton cable television station QCTV, a hotel in Jasper, a shopping centre and apartment complex in Lethbridge, and assorted other commercial enterprises.

He was also a commissioned officer of the Royal Canadian Navy who taught naval accounting and supply in Montreal and was a junior officer in the Judge Advocate General's office.

Before entering municipal politics he had already been involved in several community organizations and from 1973 until 1975 he was founding chairman of the Alberta Cultural Heritage Council.

Political career

Municipal politics 
Decore first sought office in the 1971 municipal election, when he ran for alderman in Ward 2. He finished fourth of eleven candidates; among those who defeated him was Cec Purves, against whom Decore would later run for mayor twice. He was elected as an alderman to Edmonton City Council in the 1974 election, in which he finished first of the ward's fourteen candidates. As an alderman he chaired the economic affairs committee, the budget committee and the development appeal board and served as a director of the hospital board, the local board of health, and the Greater Edmonton Foundation.  After serving a three-year term, he ran for mayor in 1977. He wound up nine thousand votes behind Purves, while finishing ahead of incumbent Terry Cavanagh—who had been appointed interim mayor by city council after the death of William Hawrelak—and four other candidates.

Interval 
Decore stayed out of electoral politics for the next six years, but was active in many community organizations. He was president of the Ukrainian Professional and Business Men's Club, secretary of the Ukrainian Canadian Committee,president of the Professional and Business Men's Association of Canada, a member of the board of directors of the Canadian Foundation for Ukrainian Studies (1977–1981), president of the Ukrainian Canadian Professional and Business Federation (1979–1981), and chairman of the Canadian Consultative Council on Multiculturalism (1980–1983). It was in this last position he led a national lobby for a constitutional amendment acknowledging Canada's multicultural nature. The result was that he helped to draft Section 27 of the Canadian Charter of Rights and Freedoms. For this work he was awarded the Order of Canada.

Mayoralty 
He returned to politics in the 1983 mayoral election when he defeated Purves in a landslide, more than doubling the incumbent's vote count and establishing a new historical plurality record. He was re-elected by a similar margin in 1986. As mayor, Decore eliminated the city's Board of Commissioners - handing more power to its elected city council - put in place a fiscal program that would eliminate the city's debt, took key major steps which began downtown revitalization and won a high-profile battle with the Province of Alberta over the city-owned telephone company's right to a fair share of long-distance revenue. He also oversaw the city's recovery after 1987's Edmonton Tornado and expressed the city's sadness over the Edmonton Oilers' trading Wayne Gretzky (the hockey team had won its first four Stanley Cups during Decore's time as mayor).

On October 17, 1988, he resigned to enter provincial politics.

Provincial politics 
As 1988 opened, the Alberta Liberal Party was led by Nicholas Taylor, who had served in this capacity since 1974. For most of those years, the party had been shut out of the Legislative Assembly of Alberta, but in the 1986 election it won its first four seats (including Taylor's) in more than a decade. This wasn't enough for some party faithful, however, and a 1987 leadership review resulted in a 1988 leadership convention (some have suggested that Decore helped orchestrate this result).

Taylor contested the convention, as did Edmonton Meadowlark MLA Grant Mitchell, but Decore won a decisive first ballot victory. In the following year's snap election, he led the party to eight seats, twice as many as it had held at dissolution of the legislature, while also getting the second-highest popular vote, though the NDP retained official opposition status with 16 seats. Decore, who was elected in Edmonton-Glengarry, defeating New Democrat John Younie, declared "there is a new party on the horizon", as one of his candidates Percy Wickman had unseated Premier Don Getty.

In the legislature, Decore focused his attacks in the government around fiscal responsibility and the province's rapidly rising debt. He was also critical of the government's involvement in the private sector which had, in some high-profile cases, resulted in companies defaulting on huge government loans. The Liberals rose rapidly in the polls, and Progressive Conservative Premier Don Getty resigned in 1992 rather than lead his party into another election that it might well lose.

The Progressive Conservatives' new leader, Environment Minister and former Calgary mayor Ralph Klein, had won the leadership in part by making arguments similar to Decore's. He favoured a near-immediate balancing of the provincial budget and rapid debt repayment thereafter, and declared his government "out of the business of business". In the 1993 election, Decore therefore faced a Premier with whom he agreed on many issues; he coped by arguing that the Progressive Conservatives had, as a party, no moral authority left on the issues on which Klein was campaigning. The campaign was also notable as the former mayors of Edmonton and Calgary were facing off as party leaders.

The Liberals won 32 of the province's 83 seats, the highest percentage they had won since leaving government in 1921 and the highest percentage won by any opposition party in the province's history. They returned to official opposition status for the first time since 1967, while banishing the New Democrats from the legislature.

Decore now led the second-largest opposition caucus in the province's history. However, many Liberal MLAs and party members were unhappy to find themselves in the opposition after expecting to win power for the first time in more than 70 years. The disappointing results led to calls within the party for Decore to step down. Decore resigned his leadership in 1994, and did not seek re-election as MLA in the 1997 election.

Personal life, death, and legacy 
His father had been a prominent member of the Ukrainian Orthodox Church of Canada and Laurence attended St. John's Ukrainian Orthdox Cathedral in Edmonton.

After leaving politics, Decore returned to business and became chairman of the Canada-Ukraine Business Initiative. He was admitted to the Order of Canada in 1983, and received an honorary doctorate of laws from the University of Alberta in 1999.

Decore was a two-time cancer survivor, having survived colon cancer in 1990 and liver cancer two years later, but a third incidence killed him in 1999. In a tribute, Prime Minister Jean Chrétien called Decore "an extraordinarily gifted leader" and "a man of vision and perseverance", while Klein said that he "brought great passion and a keen intellect to all he did in public life".

Laurence Decore Lookout, a viewing point overlooking the North Saskatchewan River in Edmonton, is named in Decore's honour, as are the Edmonton Decore electoral district and the Laurence Decore Award for Student Leadership, a provincially endowed scholarship.

References 

Edmonton Public Library biography of Laurence Decore
City of Edmonton biography of Laurence Decore
Ukrainian Canadian Professional Business Federation memorial of Laurence Decore
Ukrainian Weekly obituary of Laurence Decore
Announcement of the Laurence Decore Awards for Student Leadership
CBC account of 1993 provincial election campaign

1940 births
1999 deaths
Alberta Liberal Party MLAs
Canadian people of Ukrainian descent
Deaths from cancer in Alberta
Edmonton city councillors
Lawyers in Alberta
Leaders of the Alberta Liberal Party
Mayors of Edmonton
Members of the Order of Canada
Multiculturalism activists in Canada
People from Vegreville
University of Alberta alumni
20th-century Canadian lawyers
20th-century Canadian politicians